Engelbach may refer to:

Archibald Engelbach, former English badminton player
Florence Engelbach (1872-1951), English painter
Reginald Engelbach (1888–1946), English Egyptologist and engineer
Engelbach (Bavaria), a river of Bavaria, Germany
Engelbach (Hesse), a river of Hesse, Germany
Engelbach (Treisbach), the upper course of the Treisbach, a river of Hesse, Germany
Engelbach, a division of the town Biedenkopf in Hesse, Germany

See also
Pischelsdorf am Engelbach, a municipality in Austria